Benakatti can refer to either the village in Belgaum district in the southern state of Karnataka, India; the village in Bagalkote district also in the southern state of Karnataka, India; or the surname of several families with ancestral roots in these villages.

References

Villages in Belagavi district